Ornativalva roseosuffusella is a moth of the family Gelechiidae. It was described by Sattler in 1967. It is found in western Iran.

Adults have been recorded on wing in March and April.

References

Moths described in 1967
Ornativalva